WONDERboom is a 4 piece South African rock band from Johannesburg.

They formed in 1996 when Martin, Wade and Cito, originally in an underground band called "The Eight Legged Groove Machine", were approached by Danny, the drummer for the popular rock band, "The Electric Petals" and their manager, Patrick Horgan.

Originally they formed a funk-rock supergroup "The Electric Petal Groove Machine". Two weeks after the combination of the two groups, the band then still known as "The Electric Petal Groove Machine", opened for Simple Minds on their South African tour.

Not completely happy with their temporary name, in the summer of 1997, a road sign caught Cito's eye, just outside the Free State town of Kroonstad, pointing to a little town called "Wonderboom". 

In 2009, Danny de Wet left the band and was replaced by Garth McLeod, formerly of respected South African rock band Sugardrive. In 2013 Garth McLeod was killed in a motorcycle accident and was replaced by Jonathan Bell.



Members
Martin Cito Otto – Lead vocals, penny whistle, guitar, harmonica, multi instrumentalist.
Martin Schofield – Guitar, backing vocals, multi instrumentalist.
Wade Williams – Bass
Jonathan Bell – Drums

Discography

Awards and accolades

External links
Wonderboom (official site)
Wonderboom at the South African Rock Digest

South African rock music groups